Demetrios Ypsilantis (alternatively spelled Demetrius Ypsilanti; , ; ; 1793August 16, 1832) was a Greek army officer who served in both the Hellenic Army and the Imperial Russian Army.  Ypsilantis played an important role in the Greek War of Independence, leading several key battles. He was also member of the Filiki Eteria and the younger brother of Alexander Ypsilantis.

Early life
A member of Phanariote noble Ypsilantis family, he was the second son of Prince Constantine Ypsilantis of Moldavia. He was sent to France where he was educated at a French military school.

Union of Moldavia and Wallachia
He distinguished himself as a Russian officer in the campaign of 1814.

In 1821 he took part in the Wallachian uprising under the leadership of his brother Alexandros, that indirectly benefited the Principalities of Moldavia and Wallachia.

The Greek War of Independence

After the failure of the uprising in Wallachia, he went to the Morea (Peloponessus), where the Greek War of Independence had just broken out, as representative of Filiki Etaireia and his brother.

He was one of the most conspicuous of the Phanariote leaders during the early stages of the revolt, though he was much hampered by the local chiefs and by the civilian element headed by Alexandros Mavrokordatos; as a result the organisation of a regular army was slowed and operations were limited. He took part in the sieges of Tripolitsa, Nafplion and the Battle of Dervenakia, securing the Greek dominion in Morea.

On 15 January 1822, he was elected president of the legislative assembly. However, due to the failure of his campaign in central Greece, and his failure to obtain a commanding position in the national convention of Astros, he was compelled to retire in 1823. After the landing of Ibrahim at Morea, he took part in the defence of Naplion in the Battle of the Lerna Mills.

In 1828, he was appointed in the new established regular army by Ioannis Kapodistrias as commander of the troops in eastern Greece. On 25 September 1829, he successfully compelled Aslan Bey to capitulate at the Pass of Petra (Battle of Petra), thus ending the active operations of the war.

Personal life
He was known for an affair with Manto Mavrogenous, who was a Greek heroine of the Greek War of Independence.

Death

He died due to illness in Nafplion, Greece, on August 16, 1832.

Legacy
The city of Ypsilanti, Michigan, in the United States; founded in 1823, during the Greek struggle for independence; is named after him. A bust of Demetrios Ypsilanti stands between American and Greek flags at the base of the landmark Ypsilanti Water Tower.
 Ypsilanti, North Dakota, USA, was named by a person from Ypsilanti, Michigan, and is thus also indirectly named after Demetrios Ypsilantis.
Ypsilanti in Talbot County, Georgia, USA, was once a relatively important cotton growing centre but “is now (2010) merely a crossroads with a reported five residences."

See also
Alexander Ypsilantis (1725-1805), his grandfather
Constantine Ypsilantis, his father
Alexander Ypsilantis (1792-1828), his brother
Manto Mavrogenous, his fiancée and the love of his life

References

Sources
East, The Union of Moldavia and Wallachia, 1859 - An Episode in Diplomatic History, Thirlwall Prize Essay for 1927, Cambridge University Press (1929).

External links
 

1793 births
1832 deaths
19th-century heads of state of Greece
19th-century prime ministers of Greece
Eastern Orthodox Christians from Greece
Members of the Filiki Eteria
Members of Sacred Band (1821)
Greek generals
Hellenic Army generals
Demetrios
Greek military leaders of the Greek War of Independence
Russian military personnel of the Napoleonic Wars
Phanariotes
Constantinopolitan Greeks
Speakers of the Hellenic Parliament
Military personnel from Istanbul